Hall of Fame Classic may refer to:

 Hall of Fame Classic (baseball game)
 Hall of Fame Classic (basketball tournament)
 Hall of Fame Classic (college football game)